Buster was a sport comic magazine published in Sweden, Norway, and Finland in the period 1967–2005.

Publication history 
In Sweden, Buster was published from 1967 to 2005, first by Centerförlaget (1967–1970), then by Semic Press (1970–1997), and finally by Egmont Publishing (1997–2005).

In Norway, Buster was published from 1972 to 1977 (successively by Romanforlaget, Nordisk Forlag, and Semic), and then a new series, also by Semic, ran from 29 May 1984 to Summer 1994.

In Finland, Buster was published from 1978 until the 1980s.

Overview 
At first most of the material was taken from the UK edition, but as time went on the magazine produced more and more original material, with the focus relatively soon concentrated on British sport comics. This included "taking over" the Buster comic strip itself and changing the main character's appearance to a more typical sport-interested teenager instead of the son of Andy Capp.

Other comics included many series from the British comic Tiger (with a heavy football theme), for example Roy of the Rovers, Johnny Cougar (Johnny Puma), Curly Kayoe (Knock-Out Charlie), Hot Shot Hamish (Super-Mac, a football hero with his Great Cannon shot), Billy's Boots (Benny Guldfot) and Åshöjden BK, one of the few Swedish produced comics.

Sources 
  Sweden (Centerförlaget)
  Sweden (Semic)
  Sweden (Egmont)
  Norway (Romanforlaget)
  Norway (Nordisk Forlag)
  Norway (Semic, 1977)
  Norway (Semic, 1984–1994)

Swedish comics titles
1967 comics debuts
2005 comics endings